Priyadarshini Raje Scindia (née Gaekwad; born in 16 February 1975) is the wife of Minister of Civil Aviation Jyotiraditya Scindia.

Biography
Scindia was born in 1975. Her father, Kumar Sangramsinh Gaekwad, was the eighth child and third son of Pratap Singh Rao Gaekwad, the last maharaja of Baroda State, who ruled until 1951 when the state became a part of the Republic of India. Her mother, Asharaje Gaekwad, is a lineal descendant of the Rana dynasty of hereditary, feudal, prime ministers of Nepal. She was educated at Fort Convent School, Mumbai and thereafter at Sophia College for Women, Mumbai. In December 1994, she  married Jyotiraditya Scindia, a minister in the Indian government and member of parliament from Madhya Pradesh. The couple have one son, Mahaaryaman Scindia and one daughter, Ananya Scindia.

Scindia appeared in Verve's "Best dressed - 2008" hall of fame list. In 2012, she was included in the "India's 50 Most Beautiful Women" list by Femina.

She is involved in the restoration of Jai Vilas Mahal, Usha Kiran Palace, and formulating projects for children. According to her, "living in a palace is a full time job."

Related
Scindia
Scindia School
Scindia Kanya Vidyalaya

References

1975 births
Living people
Priyadarshini
Indian socialites
Sophia College for Women alumni
Indian people of Nepalese descent